Jakob Blasel (born 2000) is a German climate activist and politician of Alliance 90/The Greens.

Political career
Blasel grew up in Kronshagen and joined the Green Party in 2017. 

Blasel organized the first demonstration in Kiel in the fall of 2018; it was about preserving the Hambach Forest in North Rhine-Westphalia, which was to be cleared for lignite mining. Shortly after, he became the initiator of the first school strike for climate in Northern Germany. In May 2019, he addressed the ESA's Living Planet Symposium in Milan.

In 2020, Blasel completed an internship at the parliamentary office of Lisa Badum. Ahead of the 2021 national elections, he was nominated by the Green Party as a candidate for the Rendsburg-Eckernförde district in Schleswig-Holstein. He won 14.8% of first preference votes, coming third behind Sönke Rix, the SDP candidate, and Johann Wadephul, the CDU candidate.

References

External links

Living people
2000 births
21st-century German people
Climate activists
German environmentalists
People from Schleswig-Holstein
Youth climate activists